Gumuțeasca or Gomuțeasca (sometimes referred to as limba gumuțească, "Gumutseascan language", or limba de sticlă, "language of the glass") is an argot (a speech form spoken by a group of people to prevent outsiders from understanding them) used exclusively in the commune of Mărgău in Cluj County, Romania. The people of Mărgău traditionally worked with glass for centuries, making mirrors, windows and religious icons and selling them to other parts of the country such as Bucharest, the capital of Romania, or Brăila and Constanța. The people of Mărgău wandered all over the country to practice their profession, and in order to warn each other of possible dangerous people on the way to cities or to be able to put prices to their glass products without outsiders being able to understand them, they invented a form of speech that only they could understand: Gumuțeasca.

Although Gumuțeasca has been spoken for more than 100 years and it has been passed from generation to generation, today only a few people continue to speak it. This is because the practice of the traditional profession of Mărgău has been reduced considerably and because part of the local population has left the place. The emergence of insulated glazing and glass-manufacturing companies also caused the people of Mărgău to lose customers. Some linguists from Cluj County have defined the argot as a "rural professional argot", which would be the only one of this type known in Romania. Gheorghe Braica, former protopope of Cluj-Napoca and a native of Mărgău, explained in his Monografia Mărgăului ("Monograph of Mărgău") that Gumuțeasca first developed at the base of the Apuseni Mountains and that it spread from there to nearby villages.

Gumuțeasca has thousands of words and a rich vocabulary that is very different from standard Romanian. Some examples of the argot are:
Tălăuz ("Glass",  in Romanian).
Munuc ("Hey", "dude" or "lad",  in Romanian).
Munuc, s-asface spurav! ("Be careful, he/she is a dangerous person!",  in Romanian).
Munuc, s-asface deapsă! ("He/she is a good person!",  in Romanian).
Munuc, atină gădineală! ("Ask for food!",  in Romanian).
Tălăuzești? ("Do you understand?",  in Romanian; or "Do you speak Gumuțeasca?",  in Romanian).


See also
Totoiana, an inverted speech form spoken in Romania
Romanian dialects, even if Gumuțeasca does not represent a dialect

Notes

References

External links

Romanian language varieties and styles
Romanian culture
Cant languages
Occupational cryptolects
Language games
Romanian slang
Glass industry